F.C. Lumezzane S.S.D. is an Italian association football club based in Lumezzane, Lombardy. The club, formerly known as "A.S.D. Valgobbiazanano", acquiring the assets of bankrupted Associazione Calcio Lumezzane S.p.A. and acted as its successor.

History

A.C. Lumezzane 

Lumezzane was founded in 1946.

The club promoted to Serie C2 in 1993. Since the promotion, the club remained in the divisions Serie C1 (Lega Pro Prima Divisione) and Serie C2 (Lega Pro Seconda Divisione) from 1993 to 2014. The club also participated in 2014–15 Lega Pro season, the first unified Lega Pro/Serie C division since 1978.

In the regular season of 2007–08 Serie C2, Lumezzane finished fourth in the Group A, and qualified for the promotional playoffs. The team defeated third-placed Rodengo Saiano in the semi-finals, 2–1 on aggregate. In the finals, it defeated fifth-placed Mezzocorona because it was the higher classified team after the pair ended in a 0–0 aggregate tie, thus winning promotion to the now-called Lega Pro Prima Divisione for the 2008–09 season.

On 26 November 2009, Lumezzane caused an upset in the 2009–10 Coppa Italia, beating Atalanta B.C. (a Serie A team) 3–1 away from home.

2018 refoundation
A.C. Lumezzane relegated to Serie D in 2017. The club finished as the 15th of 2017–18 Serie D Group B, which relegated again. In June 2018 the club folded.

At the same time, another club, Associazione Sportiva Dilettantistica ValgobbiaZanano, was renamed to Football Club Lumezzane V.G.Z. Associazione Sportiva Dilettantistica, claiming as an heir of A.C. Lumezzane. V.G.Z. is the acronym of ValgobbiaZanano. The new club also acquired the logo and some assets of A.C. Lumezzane.

However, the club was the losing side in the promotion play-offs. A.C. ValgobbiaZanano was a merger of "A.C. Valgobbia", a team from Lumezzane and "A.C. Zanano Comisport", a team from Zanano frazione of Sarezzo circa 2003. The prefix of the club was changed to A.S.D. from A.C. in some time later.  itself, is a valley of the Lumezzane area.

In , the new Lumezzane won the promotional playoffs of Group D, thus entered the final stage of the playoffs which compete with other winners from other groups, for the spot to promote to Eccellenza Lombardy in 2019–20 season. In the season 2019–20 Lumezzane competed in Eccellenza, the fifth tier of Italian football. In 2021, the club's name was changed to F.C. Lumezzane S.S.D., thus severing every reference to ValgobbiaZanano. Lumezzane won promotion to Serie D in 2022.

Players of note
  Michele Pini (2006/07-12, 2014–15) - Made over 100 league appearances
  Mario Balotelli (2006-07) - Champions League and Serie A winner of Inter Milan and Premier League and FA Cup winner of Man City, he graduated from Lumezzane academy and grew up nearby in Concesio.
  Cristian Brocchi (1997-98) - Champions League, Serie A and Coppa Italia winner of A.C. Milan, he made 30 appearances for Lumezzane on loan during his third professional season.

Colours and badge
The colours of the team are red and blue. 

A.C. Lumezzane used a logo that resembled the crest of the comune of Lumezzane. F.C. Lumezzane also used a similar design, but have VGZ as well as year 2018 on it.

Honours
Coppa Italia Serie C
Winners: 2009–10

References

External links
  
 Official website of A.S.D. Valgobbiazanano  

 
Football clubs in Lombardy
Association football clubs established in 1946
Association football clubs established in 2018
Serie C clubs
1946 establishments in Italy
2018 establishments in Italy
Coppa Italia Serie C winning clubs